The Volvo EX30 is an upcoming battery electric crossover SUV to be manufactured by Volvo Cars. It is scheduled to debut in 2023. It will be similar in size to the Smart #1.

Overview

In November 2022, the EX30 was shown in teaser images alongside the Volvo EX90.

References

EX30
Production electric cars
Upcoming car models